Peter Anthony Luck (5 January 1944 – 6 September 2017) was an Australian author, TV journalist, producer and presenter.

Career
As a television personality, among the shows he worked on were This Day Tonight, Four Corners, Sunday, Inside Edition and Today Tonight, Bicentennial Minutes … A Time to Remember, This Fabulous Century, The Australians, 50 Fantastic Years and Where Are They Now?.

This Fabulous Century was a 37-part series produced by the Seven Network, after Luck's previous employer, the Australian Broadcasting Corporation had declined, believing that a series that relied so heavily on black-and-white film, when the country had only recently switched to colour television, would not be successful. It was shown on Sunday nights on Seven, and became the hit of 1979.

Personal life
Peter Luck was raised in Adelaide, South Australia, and attended Findon High School. Luck was married to Penny for 43 years, and they had a son and daughter.

Death
Luck died on 6 September 2017 at Concord Repatriation General Hospital. He had cancer and Parkinson's disease when he died.

Discography

Studio albums

References

External links

Peter Luck Picture Library

1944 births
2017 deaths
Australian television presenters
Deaths from cancer in New South Wales
Deaths from Parkinson's disease
Neurological disease deaths in New South Wales